Nut grass or nutgrass may refer to:

Cyperus eragrostis, tall nutgrass
Cyperus esculentus, yellow nutsedge, yellow nutgrass
 Cyperus rotundus, coco-grass, Java grass